Song One is a 2014 American romantic drama film written and directed by Kate Barker-Froyland in her directorial debut. The film stars Anne Hathaway, Johnny Flynn, Ben Rosenfield, and Mary Steenburgen. In the film, Franny Ellis returns home to New York City after her brother Henry enters a coma. She meets Henry's favorite musician, James Forester, at a concert. While trying to help Henry, Franny and James form a romantic connection during their brief time together.

Song One premiered at the 30th Sundance Film Festival on January 20, 2014, and opened in the United States on January 23, 2015, to mixed reviews from critics.

Plot 
Franny Ellis is an anthropology student doing her PhD thesis work in Morocco. She returns to her home in New York City after finding out that her brother Henry, a musician, is in a coma after getting hit by a car. She moves back in with her mother Karen after several years away. Franny listens to Henry's music and sits in his hospital room. She learns that Henry's favorite musician is British indie singer-songwriter James Forester and then attends James' concert, as he is touring in the area. Afterwards, she meets James and tells him about Henry. Franny starts to read Henry's journal and visit places that he goes to. James visits Franny and Henry at the hospital and plays a song for them. That night, Franny and James hang out. James says that his first album was successful but then he has not been able to write any new music since. Franny says that she and Henry had a fight about him pursuing music as a career and that she feels guilty because of it. They listen to live music. Franny buys a keyboard and a gramophone and takes them to the hospital. In Henry's room, she starts playing music and bringing over pancakes that he likes.

Franny and Karen celebrate Henry's half-birthday at the hospital, and James joins them. Franny and Karen argue about Franny not keeping in touch. Franny goes to James' concert that night, and afterwards, they have sex. They go out and record a song called "Afraid of Heights". The following night, James hangs out with Franny and Karen at their house. Franny and James go to a club and dance. The next day, James joins Franny and Henry at the hospital. James starts playing a new song, and Henry opens his eyes before closing them again. Henry then wakes up completely the next day. It is James' last day in the United States before he goes home. Franny tries to attend James' concert that night, but it is sold out. She watches him perform his new song on a television screen and then goes to his car. After the concert is over, James walks to his car and finds a CD there. It is a recording of him and Franny performing "Afraid of Heights". He listens to the song in his car as Franny also listens to it on her way home.

Cast

Production 
Initially, Franny was written as 24 years old. However, after Anne Hathaway (30 years old at the time) expressed her wish to play her, Barker-Froyland rewrote the part to be that of an older woman, which she said worked well for the script as it gave Franny more reason to not want to be a musician. Hathaway's previous film Les Misérables required her to adopt a shorter hairstyle than usual; rather than have her regrow the hair, the director incorporated it into the script.

Filming of Song One began in June 2013 in New York City.

Soundtrack 

The soundtrack, released by Lakeshore Records on January 13, 2015, contained original scores written by Jenny Lewis and Johnathan Rice of the indie rock duo Jenny & Johnny. Barker-Froyland met with the duo in Los Angeles and, after she listened to "Little Yellow Dress" before her plane ride to New York, decided that they would create the songs that Flynn would perform in-character.

During production, Song One producer Jonathan Demme instructed Lewis and Rice to record its music as Skip Spence recorded his 1969 psychedelic album Oar. The duo wrote eleven songs for the film, and seven were used in its composition.

Track listing

Release

Box office 
Song One premiered at the 30th Sundance Film Festival on January 20, 2014, in the U.S. Dramatic Competition. Later, the film opened in a limited release on January 23, 2015, with $20,200 in gross sales generated from 27 theaters in the United States. The film grossed $408,918 worldwide.

Critical reception 
Song One received mixed reviews from critics. The review aggregator Rotten Tomatoes gives the film an approval rating of 32%, based on 53 reviews, with an average score of 5.29/10. The site's critical consensus reads, "Song One has plenty of earnest charm, but that isn't enough to overcome its slight, familiar story." The aggregator Metacritic gives the film a score of 48 out of 100, based on 23 critics, indicating "mixed or average reviews".

References

External links 
 
 

2014 films
2014 romantic drama films
2014 directorial debut films
American romantic drama films
Films produced by Marc E. Platt
Films set in New York City
Films shot in New York City
The Film Arcade films
Worldview Entertainment films
2010s English-language films
2010s American films